The Touch is the tenth studio album from American country music band Alabama, released in 1986. It reached No.1 on the Billboard Country Albums chart and No. 69 on the Billboard 200.

Track listing

Personnel

Alabama 
 Randy Owen – lead vocals, electric guitar
 Jeff Cook – electric guitar, backing vocals, lead vocals (5)
 Teddy Gentry – bass guitar, backing vocals, lead vocals (10)
 Mark Herndon – drums

Other musicians 
 David Briggs – keyboards, string arrangements 
 Costo Davis – synthesizers
 Mark Casstevens – acoustic guitar
 Steve Gibson – electric guitar, acoustic guitar
 Brent Rowan – electric guitar
 John Willis – electric guitar
 Mike Brignardello – bass guitar
 Larry Paxton – bass guitar
 Roger Cox – drums
 Roger Hawkins – drums
 Bob Mater – drums
 Milton Sledge – drums
 Charles Buckins – percussion
 Farrell Morris – percussion
 Quitman Dennis – saxophone
 Rob Hajacos – fiddle
 The "A" Strings – strings

Production 
 Alabama – producers
 Harold Shedd – producer 
 Jim Cotton – engineer 
 Joe Scaife – engineer 
 George W. Clinton – assistant engineer 
 Paul Goldberg – assistant engineer 
 Benny Quinn – mastering at Masterfonics (Nashville, Tennessee)
 Bill Brunt at Private Eye Studio – art direction, design 
 Greg Gorman – photography

Chart performance

Album

Singles

Certifications

References

1986 albums
RCA Records albums
Alabama (American band) albums
Albums produced by Harold Shedd